Andrew "Andy" Parrish is a retired American soccer player who spent three seasons in the USL A-League.

Parrish attended Indiana University, playing on the men’s soccer team from 1995 to 1998.  He was a two time All Big Ten defender. As a senior, Parrish was a team captain as the Hoosiers won the 1998 NCAA Division I Men's Soccer Championship.  On February 6, 1999, the Dallas Burn selected Parrish in the third round (thirtieth overall) of the 1999 MLS College Draft.  He played with the team throughout the entire preseason and traveled with the team to Mexico and France.  He dressed for the home opener in the Cotton Bowl, wearing number 24, although he did not see any action. The Burn waived him on April 2, 1999.  The Indiana Blast had also selected Parrish, in the USL A-League draft. On April 21, 1999, Parrish signed with the Blast.  He was the rookie of the year for the Blast in 1999. He played three seasons with the Blast.

In 2002, he joined Wells Fargo as a financial advisor. He has been named a Five Star Wealth Advisor for "Best in Client Satisfaction"  seven times.   In 2012, Andy moved his practice and founded Greenway Advisors. Greenway Advisors focuses serving professionals and business owners.

References

External links
 
 Hoosiers in the pros
 Greenway Advisors

Living people
1976 births
American soccer players
FC Dallas players
Indiana Blast players
Indiana Hoosiers men's soccer players
A-League (1995–2004) players
People from Worthington, Ohio
FC Dallas draft picks
Soccer players from Ohio
Association football defenders
Association football midfielders